The Samogitian Division was a division-size unit of rebels of the Grand Duchy of Lithuania during the Kościuszko Uprising in 1794.

Composition 
At the beginning of July, the division had 15 regiments, totalling about 10,000 people. However, only three of those were from the regular Grand Ducal Lithuanian Army, with the majority being county militias and groups of pospolite ruszenie, both noble and peasant.

Commander 
The division's overall commander was Tomasz Wawrzecki.

History 
The Samogitian division defended northern Lithuania from the Imperial Russian army stationed in Courland, fighting it between Akmenė and Biržai. The division's left wing took over Liepoja and part of Courland west of Venta river from June 25 to July 12, and then again from 8 August to the end of that same month. The division's right wing, led by Romuald Giedroyć, defeated the Russian army in the Battle of Saločiai on July 29.

Finally, on 18 November 1794, the division capitulated in Radoszyce.

References

Sources 

 

Divisions (military units)
Kościuszko Uprising
Grand Duchy of Lithuania